UK Horizons was a television channel broadcast in the United Kingdom, as part of the UKTV network of channels, showing mainly BBC documentaries. Most programmes were abridged for commercial timing purposes. It took its name from the BBC series Horizon, which formed a staple of its output in the early years.

It was launched on 1 November 1997 along with UK Arena and UK Style. It also produced extended versions of top BBC brands such as Top Gear and Tomorrow's World. The launch editor was Bryher Scudamore and the deputy editor Eddie Tulasiewicz.

On 8 March 2004, the channel was replaced by two new channels, UKTV Documentary (now called Eden) and UKTV People (later called Blighty, and then replaced by Drama).

Programming

References

Defunct television channels in the United Kingdom
Television channels and stations established in 1997
Television channels and stations disestablished in 2004
UKTV
UKTV channels